Through the Night is a 2020 American documentary film. It depicts the lives of an owner of a 24/7 children’s daycare and three working mothers who bring their children there.

The film premiered at the 2020 BlackStar Film Festival, where it was nominated for Best Feature Documentary. It later aired as part of POV on PBS on May 10, 2021.

References

External links
 
 

American documentary films
2020 films
2020 documentary films
2020s English-language films
2020s American films